This list of historic places in  the province of Ontario contains heritage sites listed on the Canadian Register of Historic Places (CRHP), all of which are designated as historic places either locally, provincially, territorially, nationally, or by more than one level of government.

For reasons of length, the list has been divided by regions and subregions.  See separate lists for the following areas:
Central Ontario
Eastern Ontario
Kingston
Ottawa
Golden Horseshoe
Regional Municipality of Niagara
Regional Municipality of Peel
Toronto
Regional Municipality of York
Northern Ontario
Greater Sudbury
Southwestern Ontario
County of Brant
Essex County
Middlesex County
Perth County
Regional Municipality of Waterloo
Wellington County

Ontario Heritage Act Register
The Ontario Heritage Trust maintains a register on their website (see here), "a searchable database that provides information about properties in Ontario that have been designated using the Ontario Heritage Act (OHA)."

See also

List of National Historic Sites of Canada in Ontario

References